This is a list of television programs broadcast by Citytv, a Canadian television system owned by Rogers Media.

Current programming

Original series

Reality
Canada's Got Talent (2012; 2022)

Films
Fall in Love Fridays – Premieres of original films produced by Rogers and other companies domestically, mainly meant for the American Hallmark Channel.
VeraCity (2020)

Drama
Hudson & Rex (2019)
The Wedding Planners (2020)
Dead Still (2020)
Wong & Winchester (2023)

Daytime programming
Cityline (talk show) (February 20, 1984–present)

News programming
CityNews (September 12, 1977–present)
Breakfast Television (September 9, 1989–present)

Sports programming
NHL on Sportsnet (October 8, 2014–present):
Hockey Night in Canada (October 11, 2014 – present; selected games involving Winnipeg Jets, Montreal Canadiens and/or Ottawa Senators)

Multicultural programming (Toronto)
Café da Manhã
Correio da Manhã em Destaque
Eye On Asia
Festival Italiano di Johnny Lombardi
Gente da Nossa
Panorama
Polish Studio

American series

Children's programming (Saskatchewan)
 Daniel Tiger's Neighborhood (2022)
 Hi Opie!
 Hero Elementary (2021)
 Louis Says
 Monkey See, Monkey Do
 Now You Know
 Opie's Home
 PAW Patrol
 This is Emily Yeung
 Why Am I?
 Wibbly Pig

Upcoming programming

Former programming

Original series

 Awaaz E Punjab (Punjabi language program, June 1987 – August 1994) 
 The Baby Blue Movie (softcore pornography)
 Barely Cooking (adult cooking show)
 The Bachelor Canada (Moved to W Network)
 Bazaar with Gene Taylor (talk/comedy)
 The Bletchley Circle: San Francisco (2018)
 Bollywood Masala TV
 Budweiser Stage at Home (2020)
 Canada's Next Top Model (2006–2007)
 Caribbean Variety TV
 City Lights (1973–1988)
City Limits
 CityOnline (news talk show)
Croatian weekly TV show "Hrvatski putokazi" (1974–1977)
 Dharti Sohni Pakistan TV (Urdu and Punjabi language)
 Dil Dil Pakistan, named for the song "Dil Dil Pakistan"
 Discover Your World (adventure film, 1985 – 1987)
 Ed's Night Party (variety show)
 Electric Circus (1988–2003)
 FashionTelevision
 Great Movies (banner for primetime films, 1970s–2000s)
Greek Paradise
 Hello Japan
 Rogers Hometown Hockey
 Indo-Caribbean Visions
Late Great Movies (banner for overnight films, 1980s–2000s)
 Life on Venus Ave. (1991–1996)
 LunchTelevision
 MediaTelevision
 Mehek: The Fragrance Of Pakistan (Urdu and Punjabi language, 1986–1992)
 Mix TV Russian
 More Great Movies (banner for afternoon films, 1990s)
 MovieTelevision
 The NewMusic (music video show)
 Not So Great Movies (banner for Sunday afternoon B-movies, 1980s–1990s)
 Ooh La La
 Package Deal (2013–2014)
 QT: QueerTelevision
 Relic Hunter (1999–2006)
 Sajri Sawer (Punjabi language Program)
 Seed
 SexTV
 Shahre Ma TV (Iranian culture)
 The Shulman File with Morton Shulman
 Sounds Of Asia (1984–1992)
 Speak Easy with Gene Taylor (talk/comedy)
 Speakers' Corner (social commentary)
 Star!News Weekend (entertainment)
 Startv (entertainment)
 Sunnyside (sitcom, 2015)
 Toronto Rocks
 tvframes
 Vice on City (March 11, 2015 – 2016)
 Visions Of Punjab TV
 The War Years
 Young Drunk Punk (2015)
Bad Blood (2017–2018)
The Murders (2019)

Canadian syndicated series
 Beastmaster
 The Collector (2004–2007)
 First Wave (1999–2003)
 The Galloping Gourmet
 Glenn Martin, DDS (2009–2015)
 The Hilarious House of Frightenstein
 Kidsworld
 Lexx (1999–2003)
 Murdoch Mysteries
 Naked News
 Nirvanna the Band the Show
 Rocket Robin Hood
 Stargate SG-1 (2004–2008)
 Strange Paradise (1970s)
 Survivorman
 The Trouble with Tracy

American syndicated and primetime series

Comedies

 2 Broke Girls  (September 19, 2011 – April 17, 2017)
 30 Rock (2009–2013)
 Accidentally on Purpose (2009–2010)
 America's Funniest Home Videos (2006–2008; 2010–2014)
 Ben & Kate (2012–13)
 Black-ish (2014–22)
 Bless the Harts (2019–21)
 Bob's Burgers  (2015–2021)
 Bordertown (2016)
 Brooklyn Nine-Nine (2013–21)
 Chuck (comedy)
 Community
 Cougar Town (2009–2011)
 Duncanville (2020–2022)
 Enlisted (2014)
 Entourage (2008)
 Everybody Hates Chris (2006–2009)
 FailArmy (2015–21)
 Family Guy (2015–21)
 Friends (1997–2009) (reruns)
 The Great North (2021)
 Green Acres (1970s)
 Happy Endings (2011–2013)
 Happy Tree Friends (2008)
 How I Met Your Mother (2009–2015)
 The Jeffersons (reruns)
 Kenan (2021–22)
 Kröd Mändoon and the Flaming Sword of Fire
 The Last Man on Earth (2015–2018)
 Last Man Standing (2011–2013)
 Life in Pieces (2015-2019)
 The Lucy Show
 Malibu Country (2012–2013)
 The Middle
 Modern Family (2009–2019)
 Mother Up!
 Mr. Mayor (2021–22)
 Murphy Brown (2018)
 My Three Sons (1970s)
 New Girl
 The Orville (2017-2019)
 Parks and Recreation (2009–2015)
 Perfect Harmony (2019–2020)
 Rachael Ray (Sept. 18, 2006–Sept. 2014)
 Raising Hope (2011–2014)
 Rel (2018–2019)
 Rules of Engagement (2010–2012)
 Scrubs (2009–2010)
 Seinfeld (1995–2004) (reruns)
 Sex and the City (1998)
 Shameless
 The Simpsons (2018–2021)
 Single Parents (2018–2019)
 Son of Zorn
 Speechless (2017–2019)
 Spin City (2004–2005)
 Suburgatory (2011–2013)
 Super Fun Night (2013–2014)
 Supernanny
 Two and a Half Men (reruns)
 Ugly Betty (comedy drama)
 That's My Bush! (2001)

Dramas

 American Whiskey Bar
 The Assets (drama)
 Battlestar Galactica (2006–2008)
 Bluff City Law (2019)
 Body of Proof (2011–2013)
 The Blacklist (2017–2018)
 The Carrie Diaries
 Catch-22 (2019)
 Chase (2010–2011)
 The Cool Kids (2018–2019)
 Cougar Town
 Council of Dads (2020)
 Crusoe (2008–2009)
 Easy Money (2008–2009)
 The Endgame (2022)
 The Event (2010–2011)
 Empire (2015)
 Four Weddings and a Funeral (2019)
 Fringe (2010–2013)
 The Gifted (2017–2019)
 Glee (musical comedy drama)
 Godfather of Harlem (2020)
 Killer Women (2014)
 Law & Order: Special Victims Unit (reruns)
 Law & Order: UK
 Lethal Weapon (2016–2019)
 Lipstick Jungle (2008–2009)
 Lucky 7 (2013)
 Manifest (2018–21)
 Men in Trees (2006–2008)
 A Million Little Things (2018–21)
 Nip/Tuck
 Parenthood (2010–2011)
 Person of Interest (2011–2013)
 Private Practice (2011–2013)
 Privileged (2008–2009)
 The Quest
 Reaper (2007–2008)
 The Resident (2018)
 Revenge
 Roswell (2000–2002)
 The Republic of Sarah (2021)
 The Rockford Files (reruns)
 Ryan's Hope
 Scandal (2012–2015)
 The Secret Life of the American Teenager
 Smallville (2002–2005)
 Star Trek: Deep Space Nine (1993–2003)
 Star Trek: Enterprise (2001–2005)
 Star Trek: The Next Generation (1987–2001)
 Star Trek: Voyager (1995–2001)
 Supernatural
 Terra Nova (2011)
 Trauma (2009–2010)
 The Twilight Zone (2019)
 Undercovers (2010)
 Vagrant Queen (2020)
 Valentine (2008–2009)
 V.I.P. (1998–2000)
 The Whole Truth (2010)

Reality

 The 5th Wheel (2001–2004)
 13: Fear is Real (2009)
 60 Minutes (1978–1979)
 Access Hollywood (2006–2008)
 American Gladiators
 America's Next Top Model
 Banzai
 Beauty and the Geek (reality/competition)
 The Biggest Loser (2009–2012)
 Blind Date (1999–2004)
 Bring the Funny (2019)
 Card Sharks (2019–21)
 Celebrity Fit Club (2008–2009)
 Celebrity Name Game (2014–2017)
 The Chew (2011–2018)
 The Cindy Margolis Show (2000)
 Daily Mail TV (2018–2022)
 Dancing with the Stars (2017–22)
 The Doctors (2017–2022)
 Ellen (2004–2008)
 EP Daily (2009–2015)
 Extra
 Extreme Makeover: Home Edition (2009–2012)
 Extreme Weight Loss
 Girls Behaving Badly (2003–2004)
 Glam God (2008)
 Hard Copy
 Hell's Kitchen (2008–2011)
 The Howie Mandel Show (1998–1999)
 The Jay Leno Show (2009–2010)
 The Jamie Kennedy Experiment (2002–2004)
 Jimmy Kimmel Live! (2003–14)
 Joe Millionaire (2003)
 The John Walsh Show (2002–2003)
 Judge Judy (2009–2014)
 Katie (talk show)
 Kaya (2008–2009)
 Labor of Love (2020)
 Maury (1997–2006)
 Match Game (1970s–1981)
 The Mike Douglas Show
 Mind Games (2014)
 National Enquirer TV (1999–2000)
 Opportunity Knocks (2008)
 The Oprah Winfrey Show (1987–1994)
 Ordinary Joe (2021–22)
 Paradise Hotel (2019)
 The Phil Donahue Show
 Pussycat Dolls Present (2007–2008)
 Reviews on the Run (2010–2014)
 Rock of Love with Bret Michaels (2008)
 Sex Wars (2000–2001)
 Stylista (2008)
 Tattletales (1970s)
 Temptation Island (2001–2003)
 The Tonight Show
 The World's Best (2019)
 World Poker Tour
 WWE Saturday Night's Main Event (2006)

Children's programming (Saskatchewan)

The Adventures of the Aftermath Crew (2000–01)
The Adventures of Dudley the Dragon
The Adventures of Paddington Bear
The Animals of Farthing Wood (2000–03)
Anna Banana
Are You Ready?
Arthur
Babar
Backyard Bug Adventures (2002–05)
Backyard Science (2004–05)
Bananas in Pyjamas
Ballooner Landing (1993–98)
Ball Town
Be Alert Bert (2000–03)
Beezoo's Attic
Bertie the Bat
Between the Lions
Belly Button Buddies
Benjamin's Farm (2008–09)
The Big Garage
Boffins
Boo!
Bookmice (1995–99; 2001–05)
Bright Sparks (1991–95)
Budgie the Little Helicopter
Bug City
The Busy World of Richard Scarry
The Caribou Kitchen (1997; 2000–05)
CG Kids (2003–10)
Charlie and Lola
Chicken Minute (1997–2001)
Cro
Dino Dan
Dinosaur Train
The Dodo Club (1992–95; 1997)
Doggy Day School
 Doowett
Dream Street (2000–03)
East of the Moon (1998–2001)
The Electric Company
Elliot Moose (2000–03)
Eric's World
Eureeka's Castle (1992–96)
Eye of the Storm
Faerie Tale Theatre (1992–96)
Franny's Feet
The Friendly Giant
F.R.O.G.
Fun Food Frenzy (2001–04)
George Shrinks
Get Outta Town (2005; 2007–08)
Grandpa's Garden (2004–05)
Groundling Marsh
Harry and His Bucket Full of Dinosaurs
Hello Mrs. Cherrywinkle (2000–04)
Henry's Cat
Here's How!
Hi-5
The Hoobs
I Dare You
Incredible Story Studios (1998–2005)
Inuk
Iris, The Happy Professor (1994–2005)
Johnson and Friends (1993–95)
The Jungle Room (2007–11)
The Kids of Degrassi Street
Kids Planet Video (1998–2002)
Kids@Discovery
KidZone (1991–99)
Kitty Cats
The Koala Brothers (2005–11)
Lamb Chop's Play-Along (1994)
Lift Off
Little Bear
Little Robots
Little Star
Maggie and the Ferocious Beast
The Magic Library
Magic Mountain (2000–01)
The Magic School Bus
Maisy
Making Stuff
Manon
Martha Speaks
Mathica's Mathshop (1995–99; 2001–05)
The MAXimum Dimension (1999–2004)
Maya the Bee
Mighty Machines
Minuscule
Miss BG
Moko: The Young Explorer
Moomin
Mr Majeika (1992–97)
Mr Moon
Mustard Pancakes (2005–11)
My Little Planet (1999; 2000–01)
Nellie the Elephant
Nelly and Caesar
Noah's Island (2000–03)
Noonbory and the Super 7
The Ocean Room
Open Book
Ozzie the Owl
Paper, Scissors, Glue (2002–05)
Paul Hann and Friends (1991–96)
PB Bear and Friends
Pingu
Pinky Dinky Doo
Planet Echo
Polka Dot Door (1991–96)
Polka Dot Shorts (1997–2002)
Poppy Cat
Pop It!
Popular Mechanics for Kids
Prairie Berry Pie (2000–07)
Press Gang (1993–98)
The Prime Radicals (2011–13)
The Puzzle Place (1998–2001)
Quizzine
The Raggy Dolls (1994–95; 1997–99)
Rainbow Fish
Really Bend it Like Beckham (2004–05)
Renegadepress.com (2004–05)
Return to the Magic Library
Ricky's Room
Riddle of Wizard's Oak (1991–93; 1997–99)
The Riddlers
Rob the Robot
Rockabye Bubble (2001–04)
Rolie Polie Olie
Sagwa, the Chinese Siamese Cat
Salty's Lighthouse (2000–02)
Sesame Street (1991–92)
The Shelley T. Turtle Show
Shining Time Station (2000–04)
Sid the Science Kid
The Silver Brumby (2000–03)
Snailympics (2000–04)
Space Stretch
Spellz (2008–11)
Spot
Stuff
Suzuki's Nature Quest (2001–02; 2004)
SWAP-TV
Taste Buds
Teddybears
Teletubbies (1999–2007)
Teletubbies Everywhere (2003–07)
Think Big
This is Daniel Cook
Timothy Goes to School
Tiga Talk
Tipi Tales
Today's Special (1993)
The Toothbrush Family (2000–01; 2003–04)
Tots TV (1994–2004)
The Toy Castle (2000–10)
Tractor Tom (2003–05)
Twinkle Toes
Vrrrooommm! (2000–03)
Wapos Bay
The Way Things Work
What-a-Mess
The Wind in the Willows
Wishbone
Why?
Wonder Why?
The World of David the Gnome (1993–98; 2002–07)
A World Of Wonders
Worzel Gummidge (1994–96; 1998)
Worzel Gummidge Down Under (1996–97; 1999–2001)
Yoho Ahoy
Zoboomafoo

References

External links
Citytv

Citytv